TJ Baník Kalinovo is a Slovak football team, based in the town of Kalinovo. The club was founded in -.

Colors and badge 
Its colors are green and white or red-blue.

References

External links 
 Futbalnet profile 
 at kalinovo.sk 
 

Football clubs in Slovakia